The Hays Larks are a collegiate summer baseball team located in Hays, Kansas. The Larks evolved from Hays during the 1946 season. From 1869 to 1945, the team went by the name of The Hays Town Team and was sponsored by various organizations and businesses in Hays. The Larks were part of the Jayhawk Collegiate League conference and were league champions in 2001, 2002, 2003, 2005, and 2006. The Larks have finished as NBC national runner-up four times: in 1995 with their only two losses to Team USA, 2000, 2001, 2007, and 2016. 

As of 2020 the Larks are playing in the Rocky Mountain Baseball League and won the league in 2020, their inaugural year joining. 

The team is managed by Frank Leo who is a member of the Kansas Baseball Hall of Fame.

Former Hays Larks
 Mitch Webster
 Aaron Crow
 Nolan Reimold
 Jim Leyritz                               
 Lance Berkman                                   
 Albert Pujols                                   
 B. J. Ryan                                       
 Jason Frasor                                   
 Jack Wilson
 Mark Alexander

References

External links
 The Hays Larks
 LarksNetwork.com - Live streaming video of select games

Amateur baseball teams in Kansas
1946 establishments in Kansas
Baseball teams established in 1946
Hays, Kansas